Don Giovanni is an album by the Italian singer-songwriter Lucio Battisti. Nearly four years in its making, it was released in March 1986 by the Numero Uno label and was later re-released by Sony BMG. In stylistic terms, it features an avant-garde blend of an almost minimalist sound, featuring synthpop inspired electronics, with classic Italian popular music. The title of the album alludes to Mozart's famous work Don Giovanni.

Track listing 
All lyrics written by Pasquale Panella, all music composed by Lucio Battisti.
 "Le cose che pensano" (The thinking things) – 4:26
 "Fatti un pianto" (Have a good cry) – 4:54
 "Il doppio del gioco" (Betting the double) – 4:14
 "Madre pennuta" (Feathered mother) – 4:28
 "Equivoci amici" (Questionable Friends) – 3:53
 "Don Giovanni" – 3:40
 "Che vita ha fatto" (What kind of life did he live?) – 4:01
 "Il diluvio" (The Flood) – 6:24

See also

Don Giovanni
Italian popular music

References

1986 albums
Lucio Battisti albums